Chaderton is a surname. Notable people with the surname include:

 Edmund Chaderton, English archdeacon
 Laurence Chaderton ( 1536–1640), English Puritan divine
 Roy Chaderton (born 1942), Venezuelan politician, lawyer, and diplomat
 William Chaderton ( 1540–1608), English academic and bishop